The Tally Toor is the local name for a Martello tower in Leith, Edinburgh, Scotland. It is one of Scotland's three Martello towers, the other two being at Hackness and Crockness in Orkney. Originally built offshore on a rocky outcrop called the Mussel Cape Rocks, the land around it was subsequently reclaimed, and the building now lies, half-buried, in an industrial area on the eastern breakwater of Leith Docks.

History

Tally Toor was built in 1809 during the period of the Napoleonic Wars to defend the entrance of Leith Harbour at a cost 17,000 pounds. The tower was altered in 1850 to add a trefoil gun-emplacement and reorganise the interior accommodation. 

Irish folk symbols carved on the stonework indicate that it was built by Irish navvies.

Later, during the Second World War, the tower housed an anti-aircraft battery.

On 27 April 1964, it was designated as a Scheduled Ancient Monument by Historic Environment Scotland. Keys to the structure are with Forth Ports.

References

Towers completed in 1809
Buildings and structures in Leith
Towers in Scotland
Martello towers
Infrastructure completed in 1809
1809 establishments in Scotland
Scottish coast
Scheduled monuments in Scotland
Category B listed buildings in Edinburgh
Listed forts in Scotland